Barbara Zecchi is a feminist film scholar, film critic, videoessayist, and film festival curator. She is professor of Film Studies and director of the Interdepartmental Program in Film Studies at the University of Massachusetts Amherst.

Biography 
Born in London, United Kingdom, to Italian parents, she grew up in Venice, Italy, and graduated with honors in modern languages and cultures at Ca' Foscari University of Venice. She received a master's degree in literary studies, specializing in Hispanic studies and gender studies, from the University of California, San Diego (UCSD), and a second master's degree in Italian studies and film studies from the University of California, Los Angeles (UCLA). She completed her PhD at UCLA with a thesis on the representation of gender-based violence in Spain and Italy. More recently she studied screenwriting at the Escuela de Guion in Madrid with Alicia Luna, and video-graphic criticism at Middlebury College with Jason Mittell and Chris Keathley.

Career 
Zecchi is Professor of Film Studies in the area of Visual and Performance Studies and Director of the Film Studies Program at the University of Massachusetts Amherst. She specializes in feminist film theory, adaptation theory, gender studies and cultural gerontology, video-graphic criticism, and digital humanities. From to 2011 to 2015, she served as graduate program director and Head of the Spanish and Portuguese Unit of the Dept. of Languages, Literatures and Cultures. From 2014 to 2016 she directed the UMass Translation Center. She taught at various European and American universities, including Saint Mary's College of California, California State University, Johns Hopkins University, Universidad Carlos III in Madrid, and in the Master programs of the Universitat de Valencia and the Universitat de Girona. She has lectured and presented her video-graphic essays in Italy, Spain, Portugal, England, Cuba, Dominican Republic, Mexico, Canada and the United States. In 2016 she was elected associate member of the Spanish Film Academy (Academia de las Artes y las Ciencias Cinematográficas de España).

Publications 
In her publications, Zecchi develops an analysis of women film production. In Desenfocadas/Out of focus she follows the struggle of different generations of women filmmakers trying to find a space in the male-dominated world of cinema vis-à-vis the evolution of their historical context and of the feminist movement. The ultimate goal of this study is to demonstrate that despite the obvious changes, women are still subjected to traditional values without any real alternative to patriarchal stereotypes in dominant cinema, but at the same time, these stereotypes are deconstructed by each generation of women directors, in each historical period. For Esther Gimeno Ugalde, 

La pantalla sexuada/The Gendered Screen focuses on five topics that are central to feminist film theory (i.e., space, authorship, pleasure, body and violence) in an attempt to reveal the gendered dynamics that have been used in movies to expropriate the feminine and with the goal of studying the gradual process of re-appropriation of a space, a gaze and an agency.

She is the founder and director of the Gynocine Project, a Digital Humanities open source project launched with a seed grant of the University of Massachusetts in 2011, with the aim of increasing the visibility of women's cinema. The term of her coinage "gynocine" is an alternative to the limiting labels that have dominated the discussions on women-directed cinema. According to Pérez Villanueva, Zecchi understands "gynocine" as a "theoretical and practical tool that allows for a feminist reading of any film regardless of the gender of the author".

Zecchi is vice-director of the international multidisciplinary network cinemAGEgender based in Birmingham, England, which studies the intersection of cultural gerontology with gender studies and film studies.

In 2020 her book Desenfocadas (Out of focus) was selected by the Spanish daily national newspaper El Diario as one of the “13 books that have defined the decade".

Selected publications 
 Sexualidad y escritura (1850–2000) (co-edited with Raquel Medina). Barcelona: Anthropos, 2002 
 La mujer en la España actual ¿Evolución o involución? (co-edited Jacqueline Cruz). Barcelona: Icaria, 2004 
 Teoría y práctica de la adaptación fílmica. Madrid: Editorial Complutense, 2011 
 Gynocine: Teoría de género, filmología y praxis cinematográfica Zaragoza: Publicaciones Universidad Zaragoza, 2013 
 Desenfocadas: cineastas españolas y discursos de género, Barcelona: Editorial Icaria, 2014 
 La pantalla sexuada, Madrid: Editorial Cátedra, 2015 
 Tras las lentes de Isabel Coixet: género y cine. Zaragoza: Publicaciones Universidad de Zaragoza, Colección Vidas (PUZ), 2017 
 Gender-Based Violence in Latin American and Iberian Cinemas, (co-edited with Rebeca Maseda and María José Gámez Fuentes), Routledge, London and New York, 2020.

Film festivals 
Zecchi has been involved with national and international film festivals in different capacities. She was a member of the Official Jury of the Film Festival Cines del Sur in Granada, Spain, in 2014, and a member of the Flecos Awards Jury in 2017. In 2018 she collaborated with Cines del Sur as a film critic and wrote daily film reviews for Caimán Cuadernos de Cine Journal. She participated at MICGénero Film Festival in Mexico in 2016 as a member of the Gender Lab Jury, and in 2018 with Ruby Rich she conducted a workshop on Feminism and Queer Theory. She collaborates with the Massachusetts Multicultural Film Festival, the UMass Latin American Film Festival, and she is the founder and co-curator of the Massachusetts Catalan Film Festival.

References 

Living people
University of Massachusetts Amherst faculty
University of California alumni
Film theorists
Italian feminists
Year of birth missing (living people)